Bernardo Mario Kuczer (born 30 April 1955) is an Argentinian composer, music theoretician and architect.

Biography

Argentina 
Bernardo Mario Kuczer was born in Buenos Aires, Argentina, on 30 April 1955. Until his early twenties, he was involved in rock music as composer and guitarist, writing also music for the theatre. Simultaneously, he studied architecture and graduated in 1978.

Through the study of the classical guitar with Hector Rocha and then with Jorge Panitsch he came into classical music. He studied harmony and musical analysis with Nestor Zadoff and then with Sergio Hualpa and later Renaissance counterpoint with Nestor Zadoff. He became a member of an interdisciplinary music investigation group, collaborating with psychologists, biologists, doctors and musicologists.

In 1979 he presented a thesis under the supervision of Sergio Hualpa with own ideas about "the Basic Components of Music, their multiple interrelations and a special kind of "energy" generated by their uni- and multidimensional dynamic interactions, an energy which determines and enables the micro and macro Articulation of the Music-stream". The thesis was first named: "La forma natural de la música" ("The natural ways of music"), then "The New Connections" and later "Música sin el Factor Humano" ("Music without the Human Factor").

Europe 
In 1980, Kuczer went to London to study the viola da gamba, abandoning it shortly after for starting composition.

His first ensemble piece ("Even ... the loudest sky") (1981) for saxophone quartet, was selected by the British SPNM (Society for the Promotion of New Music) for the "composers' week-end", London 1981.

Kuczer arrived in Freiburg in 1983 to study composition with Brian Ferneyhough. He felt however very soon the need to continue his way in music alone.

In 1984 he was invited to participate of the "International Summer Courses for New Music" at Darmstadt, where several pieces of his tape-cycle Civilización o Barbarie received a first performance and where he was awarded, as first Latin American composer, the "Kranichsteiner Musikpreis" (Kranichstein Music Prize).

In 1986, for the next edition of the Darmstadt Courses, he was invited to perform a second concert with works of his tape-cycle.

Civilización o Barbarie  was later selected, as personal choice of the jury, by Klaus Huber (one of the three jurors), for the "World Music Days" of the ISCM (International Society for Contemporary Music) held in 1987 in Cologne.

During 1990 he was a stipendiary of the "Heinrich-Strobel-Stiftung" (Heinrich Strobel Foundation) of the broadcasting service Südwestrundfunk.

After 1999 he remained apart and distant to the active music and concert scene.

Since 2000, he has been working extensively with computers, designing, writing and developing his own computer programs. These programs, which are based on and are used to further research his personal hypotheses, models and theoretical ideas about harmony, rhythm, sound, musical form and "Music-Stream", have also been used to generate his latest digital, computer and algorithmic generated works.

At times and complementary to his main musical activities, Kuczer has been active in other fields of art. He has produced more than 1000 paintings, drawings, sculptures, as well as designed his own furniture. As a writer he has written some 250 poems and two (still unpublished) books, the title of the first one being: "Salvas de Guerra" (contra La Música)" ["War Salvos" (against Music)]. He also produced and musicalised an own documentary film: "Vida?"(por un Espacio Poético o una Poesía del Espacio-Tiempo), una documentación" ["Life?" for a Poetic Space or a Space-Time Poetry, a documentation].

Work and performances 
Kuczer's musical oeuvre comprises more than 81 (principal) works (with some 110 individual "named" pieces) covering different areas of music (e.g. instrumental music, tape music, electroacoustic music, computer music, algorithmic compositions and digital music).

More than 60 of his works have remained unperformed (and mostly unrevealed). Several of his instrumental pieces were and/or are still considered unplayable. His Saxophone Quartet (1981) was first regarded as unplayable until 1994, when it was given its first performance. Some of his works have been played and broadcast in various European cities and elsewhere.

Examples:
London: „Composers' Weekend“, 1981
Darmstadt: Darmstädter Ferienkurse, 1984 and 1986
Como: „18° festival internazionale, autunno musicale“, 1984
Milan: „Musica del nostro tempo“, 1987
Freiburg: „Horizonte Reihe“, 1984
Paris: „Perspectives du XXe siècle“ (Carte blanche à Harry Halbreich), 1985
Stockholm: „International Festival of Electronic Music“, 1985
Freiburg: „Aventure Freiburg“, 1987
Mönchengladbach: „Ensemblia Festival“, 1987
Cologne: Weltmusiktage der IGNM, 1987
Frankfurt: Hessischer Rundfunk, 1989
Los Angeles: Arnold Schoenberg Institute, 1990
Witten: Wittener Tage für neue Musik, 1994
Basel: IGNM Basel, 1995
Piteå: Piteå University, 1995
Bremen: Festival „Transit“ Orte/NichtOrte, 1999
Montreal: World Saxophone Congress, 2000

Press reviews 
... the real revelation of this disc is Argentinian Bernardo Maria Kuczer, whose "even ... The loudest sky!!" is one of the wildest things I've heard for some time. Brilliantly written (fiendishly difficult) and played with utter conviction, it makes you wonder what Kuczer's been up to since he wrote this back in 1981. Anything new by either Kuczer or [the saxophone ensemble] Xasax is welcome here.

On the 2 May 1996, Fara C. wrote in the music magazine World:
..., and " Even … The loudest sky!!! ", composed by the Argentine Bernardo Kuczer in 1981.

This work reaches a summit of complexity such as it had never been played before the world creation of Xasax in 1994 ! Six months of hard work were necessary to the group to triumph over these supernatural seven minutes. A musical intensity which the quartet will make us share with crazy pleasure.

The Belgian musicologist Harry Halbreich wrote a review about the Darmstadt International Summer Courses of New Music 1984, published in the monthly magazine Le Monde de la musique:

However, the end of the evening had to be spent... in the company of the Argentinian Bernardo Kuczer living in Germany and some of his apocalyptic electroacoustic pieces grouped into an immense cycle under the title Civilización o Barbarie. I admit that I fled. But two days later I was able to hear again, at a somewhat more bearable volume level, these extraordinary pieces of music of a visionary madman, skinned alive, bleeding shreds of flesh of a prodigious expressive power, produced, paradoxically, with a simple cassette tape recorder!

Work list 
Articulaciones II (1980), for two alto recorders (or two equal wind instruments), tuned at a quarter tone difference
Seis estudios sobre la disonancia simple y la mixtura de lenguas (1980), for choir
Huella (1981), for flute
Dualidades (1981), for piano
Drei'h (1981), for clarinet
Even ... the loudest sky (1981), for saxophone quartet
A-gent's Arguum (1982), for viola
La Distancia IV (un fragmento) 1982–83, for flute, bass clarinet, violoncello and piano
towards a New Brutality (1983), nine studies
Study Nº 1: (Historias Naturales), for percussion and (digital) Sound-Space (*)
Study Nº 2: (Soul-Lage), for voice in a Sound-Space (*)
Study Nº 3: (La vuelta al día Ia), for percussion (two roto-toms)(*)Study Nº 4: (memorias de un pasado por suceder...) (1983), for two percussionists, voice, tape and electronicesStudy Nº 5: (La vuelta al día II: de Spatium Natura), for Space-Percussion (*)Study Nº 6 & 7: (Twin dances)
Nº 6 dance A, for percussion and (digital) Sound-Space (*)Nº 7 dance B, for percussion and (digital) Sound-Space (*)Study Nº 8: (El espejo y la lámpara I), for percussion (*)Study Nº 9: (El espejo y la lámpara II), for voice and percussion (*)(*) revised in 2012, now existing only as digital versionCivilización o Barbarie (1984), a cycle comprising the following 18 individual tape pieces:Peripéteia II (1984), tape musicPeripéteia III (1984), tape musicPeripéteia IV (1984), tape musicPeripéteia V (1984), tape musicPeripéteia VI (1984), tape musicPeripéteia VII: Iña'K (1984), tape music Peripéteia VIII: Periplo (1984), tape musicUne mémoire la vie (1984), tape musicCri de la mémoire fermée (1984), tape musicFinale, ou la mémoire pulsante (1984), tape musicContre-rime (1984), tape musicHim'l (1984), tape musicDream-line (1984), tape musicOne other desert (1984), tape musicEscenas-Miró (1984), tape musicEjercicio de aire (1984), tape musicHole the black (1984), tape music ... und Stille daneben (1984), tape musicK'tedral (1984–85) for violaformas y fluidos II–VII (1985) for pianoForm-Memory (1986), tape music Memory-Form (1986), tape musicEquations of change (1987), computer musicIn search of the Engram (1986–88, 89–90), for wind quintetZeitschlag     -Brücken (zer-)schlagen- (1991–2001), a cycle comprising the following 8 pieces (with possible amplification and/or electronic processing):FORM I (1991–98), for viola, cello and 1 or 2 pianos or for cello and pianoFORM II (1991–98), for viola, cello and (1 or) 2 pianosFORM III (1991–98), for viola and pianoFORM IV (1991–98), for viola, cello and 1 or 2 pianosZickZackZeit (1991–97), for violinZeit-Raum-Zerre II (1991–99), for celloZeit-Raum-Zerre III (1991–99), for viola and celloZiele umzingelnd (2000–01), for violin, viola and cello (String trio)Cosmografía -Panopticum Armonicum- (2002–04), for pianoSinfines (2002–04), for piano, piano four hands or two to five pianosLa vuelta al día Ic (1983, 2000, 2006) (computer generated versions and scores), for 1, 2, 3, 4, 6 or 8 percussionistsResistencia de la materia (2011–12), a cycle comprising the following 5 independent digital works:Tungsteno (2011–12), digital musicCasi Ayer (2011–12), digital musicSiglo XX: Un Respiro (2011–12), digital musicA-Sintaxis III (2011–12), digital musicSiglo XX, Pequeño Epitafio Nº2: Esmeril (2011–12), digital musicTrenzados americanos (2011–12), digital musicDrama de amar (2011–12), for digital percussion, digital musicMalambo (2011–12), digital musicCuicantos (2011–12), for digital percussion ensemble, digital music (*)Sureña Ic (2012), for piano (*)(*) these pieces belong to the so-called Apócrifos americanos, a series of composer aided, computer generated studiesSendas negras (2012), for percussion ensembleSchwarmverhalten I (1986–2012), digital musicSchwarmverhalten II (1986–2012), digital musicSchwarmverhalten III (1986–2012), digital musicAuf Wachstum und Gedeih (2012), digital musicMáximos y Mínimos (en un Nanocosmos) (2012–13), a collection of 27 digital worksMúsica de cámara Nº1 (algo oscura) (2013), digital musicMúsica de cámara Nº2 (donde hubo fuego) (2013), digital musicJuego de engranajes (2013), digital musicGris ardiente (2013), digital musicLos Pasos Perdidos (2013), digital musicLo heterogéneo (2013–14), a cycle comprising nine independent digital works, belonging to four different groups:Tres Hibridaciones (2013), a group of three independent digital worksCanticum Sacrum Non (2013), digital musicFormas nobles y melancólicas (2013), digital musicTourdion (et basse) (2013), digital musicUna Decantación (2014), comprising a single independent digital workUn sol menor (2014), digital musicTres Aleaciones (2014), a group of three independent digital worksStehe hier nicht still... (2014), digital musicMarcha plana (2014), digital musicTres ceremonias (an der Schmelzgrenze) (2014), digital musicDos Imbricaciones (2014), a group of two independent digital worksImbricación I (Süredrath) (2012, 2014), digital musicImbricación II (Silétsere) (2014), digital musicLa rueca de Mahatma (natura subascolta II) (2014), digital musicW(e)aving (Ein Heldentod (sic)), Digitale Tondichtung (2013–14), digital musicKalte Töne (2013–14), digital musicTodo y Molécula (2013–14), a cycle comprising 6 independent digital works1) Materia prima I, set 1c (Custos Horologii) (2014), digital music2) Materia prima II (Magma) (2014), digital music3) Materia prima III (Música Seca I) (2014–16), digital music4) Materia prima IV (Schwere Schwebstoffe) (2014–16), digital music5) Materia prima VI (Enigma XXI) (2014), digital music6) Materia prima VII (Traits and Trails) (2014), digital musicHeridas (2016), digital musicExploración Diagonal Nº2 (2014–17), digital musicAnima XM'ch'na I (Principal Pieces) (2017-2021), algorithmic compositions, digital musicNº5 (XM'nc'ng) (2018) Nº10 (XM'm'ri's) (2018) Nº12 (XM'sh) (2018)Nº13 (XM'rr'r) (2018)Nº14 (XM'sur's) (2018)Nº16 (XM'n'l'g) (2019)Nº18 (XM'n'l'th) (2019)Nº19 (XM'd'nt) (2019)Nº21 (XM'sa'k) (2019)Nº23 (XM'nt'cs) (2019)Nº24 (XM'ns'ons) (2019)Nº29 (XM'b) (2019)Nº30 (XM'sts) (2019)Anima XM'ch'na I, Addendum (Secondary Pieces) (2017-2021), algorithmic compositions, digital musicNº1 (XM'ng'lia) (2017) (**)Nº2 (XM'r'ñao) (2017) (**)Nº3 (XM'g'n'tio) (2018) (*)Nº7 (XM'n'us) (2018) (***)Nº11 (XM'nf'st) (2018) (*)Nº15 (XM'dn'ght) (2019) (*)Nº20 (X(M)p'nto) (2019) (*)Nº22 (XM'ths) (2019) (*)Nº25 (XM'ss1) (2019) (*)Nº26 (XM'ss3) (2019) (*)Nº27 (XM'ss4) (2019) (*)Nº28 (XM'ss5) (2019) (*)

Note: the pieces, result of automatic generation and creation processes, were then (loosely) classified into the following categories: (*) Genéricos Instrumentales (Gramática de la (N.) Música (standard)), (**) Genéricos Globales (World Music), (***) Genéricos Americanos.Nº 11 (XM'nf'st II) (2018) (digital piano sound),  algorithmic composition, digital musicAftermat(h)'' (2020) (digital piano sound), algorithmic composition, digital music

Notes

References 

Argentine composers
German composers
Music theorists
1955 births
Living people
20th-century Argentine male artists
21st-century Argentine male artists
20th-century composers
21st-century composers